John A. Macdonald was Canada's first Prime Minister

John Macdonald may also refer to:

John MacDonald (Prince Edward Island politician) (1838–1905), former speaker of the Prince Edward Island assembly
John Macdonald (Prince Edward Island politician) (1874–1948), Canadian member of parliament for King's, Prince Edward Island
John Macdonald (Nova Scotia politician) (1883–1945), Conservative member for Richmond-West Cape Breton, Nova Scotia, Senator
Jack MacDonald (Hamilton politician) (1927–2010), businessman, journalist, and mayor of Hamilton, Ontario
John McDonald (Nova Scotia politician) (1889–1962), Liberal senator from Nova Scotia

See also
 John Macdonald (disambiguation)